Donna Adamek (born February 1, 1957 in Duarte, California is an American tenpin bowler who was named WIBC Bowler of the Year four times (1978–1981). She competed nationally on the PWBA Tour.

Adamek grew up in Monrovia, California, about 14 miles northeast of Los Angeles with her parents and her three older siblings.

Career

Adamek started bowling at a very young age. Her parents recount that she was beating the adult bowlers at age 10 - and even rolled a 200 in the fourth game she ever bowled. In 1975, Adamek received the Alberta E. Crowe Star of Tomorrow Award for being the top junior bowler. This success inspired her to turn professional. By 1976, after dropping out of California State University at age 19, she joined the professional circuit. Though naturally left-handed, Adamek bowls right-handed.

Nicknamed "The Mighty Mite", as she was just five feet, two inches tall and 125 pounds, Adamek dominated women's bowling between 1978 and 1981. She has won 19 professional titles in her 16-year career as a professional. Among those wins were the WIBC Queens title in 1979 and 1980, two U.S. Opens, and the Sam's Town Invitational in 1988. Adamek is a member of the PWBA and WIBC (now USBC) Halls of Fame.

References

External links 
 Hall of Fame biography at bowl.com
 Hickok Sports Biography

1957 births
American ten-pin bowling players
American sportswomen
Living people
People from Duarte, California
Sportspeople from Los Angeles County, California
21st-century American women